Cephisodotus may refer to:
Cephisodotus (general), the Athenian general and statesman
Cephisodotus the Elder, sculptor, the father of the sculptor Praxiteles 
Cephisodotus the Younger, sculptor, the son of the sculptor Praxiteles